Sontsov, feminine: Sontsova is the surname of the Russian noble family of Sontsovs. The family of Sontsovs is a 17th-century spin-off of the family of Sontsov-Sasekin.

Among the property of the Sontsovs was Sontsovka, the birthplace of Russian composer Sergei Prokofiev. It was founded in the 18th century by the former governor of Poltava Governorate, Alexander Sontsov, and owned by Dmitri Dmitrievich Sontsov during Prokofiev's childhood.

The surname may refer to:

), Russian horse-breeder, horse-breeding book author
Dmitry Sontsov, Russian numismatist
 (1750—1811), Russian statesman, governor of Voronezh Governorate (1797–1800, 1805–1811) and Poltava Governorate
 (1785—1850), Russian statesman, governor of Voronezh Governorate (1820–1824) and Oryol Governorate (1824-1830)

References

Russian-language surnames
Russian nobility

ru:Сонцовы